"Cuddle Buggin' Baby" is a country music song written Red Rowe, sung by Eddy Arnold, and released on the RCA Victor label. In July 1950, it reached No. 2 on the country best seller chart. It spent 17 weeks on the charts and was the No. 7 best selling country record of 1950.

See also
 Billboard Top Country & Western Records of 1950

References

Eddy Arnold songs
1950 songs